Classical superconductor may refer to:

 In the context of classical electrodynamics or general physics: a perfect conductor with no special quantum mechanical properties.  No such substances are known to exist, but they are useful simplifications of certain systems such as magnetohydrodynamics and electrical circuits.
 In the context of high-temperature superconductivity: a conventional superconductor.